Alcathousiella is a genus of beetles in the family Cerambycidae, containing a single species, Alcathousiella polyrhaphoides.

References

Acanthocinini
Beetles described in 1855
Monotypic Cerambycidae genera